The 19045 / 19046 Tapti Ganga Express is an Express train running between  of Gujarat and  of Bihar. The train is named for the Tapti River in Surat and the Ganga River in Chhapra.

It operates as train number 09045 from Surat to Chhapra Junction and as train number 09046 in the reverse direction, serving the states of Gujarat, Maharashtra, Madhya Pradesh, Uttar Pradesh and Bihar.

Coach composition

The train consists of 22 coaches:

 4 AC III Tier
 11 Sleeper class
 1 Pantry car
 4 General Unreserved
 2 EOG cum Luggage Rake

Services

19045 Surat–Chhapra Tapti Ganga Express covers the distance of 1728 km in 32 hours 45 mins (53 km/hr) & in 33 hours 40 mins as 19046 Chhapra–Surat Tapti Ganga Express (51 km/hr).

As the average speed of the train is below , as per Indian Railway rules, its fare doesn't include a Superfast surcharge.

Route

,
,  to Chhapra Junction.

Rake sharing

The train shares its rake with 22947/22948 Surat–Bhagalpur Express.

Traction

Both trains are hauled by a Vadodara-based WAP-7 locomotive on its entire journey.

See also

 Shramik Express
 Udhna–Varanasi Express
 Udhna–Danapur Express
 Jaynagar–Udhna Antyodaya Express

References

Transport in Chhapra
Transport in Surat
Named passenger trains of India
Rail transport in Uttar Pradesh
Rail transport in Gujarat
Rail transport in Madhya Pradesh
Express trains in India
Rail transport in Bihar
Rail transport in Maharashtra